Meggle may refer to:

 Meggle AG, a German dairy company
 Thomas Meggle, German footballer and coach